Malaysian television broadcasting was introduced on 28 December 1963. Colour television was introduced on 28 December 1978. Full-time colour transmissions were officially inaugurated on New Year's Day 1982. There are currently 16 national free-to-air terrestrial television channels in Malaysia and 3 national pay subscription television operators in Malaysia.

Broadcasting 
Transmissions in Malaysia were black-and-white until 28 December 1978, when colour transmissions were introduced. First stereo audio broadcasting was introduced in 1985 by TV3. Five out of eight channels do not have 24-hour schedule. 24-hour television was introduced in Malaysia between 13 and 16 May 1989 on TV1. The first 24-hour broadcasting in Malaysia was introduced in 1997 by TV3, but was discontinued later due to energy-saving plan (see below). Since April 2006, TV2 broadcast round-the-clock followed by TV1, which began broadcasting 24 hours in August 2012 after having short-lived round-the-clock broadcast previously.

Television providers 
Subscription providers are available, with differences in the number of channels, capabilities such as the programme guide (EPG), video on demand (VOD), high-definition (HD), interactive television via the red button, and coverage across Malaysia. Set-top boxes are generally used to receive these services. Households viewing TV from the internet also tracked by the Malaysian government.

Analogue terrestrial television 
This was the traditional way of receiving television in Malaysia, however it is being supplanted by digital providers. There are eight channels; three of them are government public-owned by Radio Televisyen Malaysia (RTM). The three television channels are terrestrial free-to-air TV1, TV2 and TV Okey (formerly TVi and TV5). TV Alhijrah is owned by Al Hijrah Media Corporation while TV3, NTV7, 8TV and TV9 are private and commercially owned by Media Prima. Worldview Broadcasting Channel was commercial-owned by Worldview Broadcasting Channel (Malaysia) Sendirian Berhad. It has since closed down in October 2012 after they were unable to operate the channel due to financial difficulties. Analogue terrestrial transmissions were scheduled to be switched off in phases as part of the digital switchover, expected to be completed in 2020 as a recommendation from Southeast Asia. On 31 December 2018, digital television consortium MYTV Broadcasting scheduled the switchoff on third quarter 2019, to allow a period of digital set-top box distribution to eligible viewers with low income. The frequency has been moved to avoid signal jamming with television in Thailand and preventing Singaporeans from watching foreign-copyrighted programming, especially that contains Chinese dialects (mainly in Cantonese and Hokkien) on free-to-air, due to tight censorship currently in place in Singapore. The analogue were indefinitely switched off nationwide on 31 October 2019.

Digital terrestrial television 
In 2005, the Ministry of Information announced their plan to digitalise nationwide free-to-air TV broadcasts led by Radio Televisyen Malaysia (RTM). Trial broadcasts were undertaken, involving one thousand households in the Klang Valley from September 2006 till February 2007. According to the then-Deputy Minister of Information, Chia Kwang Chye, the trial received "very positive" feedback, i.e. "more than 60 percent said the quality of the signal ranged from good to very good. Over 88 percent said the picture quality improved, while 70 percent said the sound quality was better".

On 1 January 2008, TV3 announced that they were carrying out their own tests using a completely different system, T-DMB. However their test transmission is available only to areas surrounding their main headquarters at Sri Pentas, Bandar Utama, Petaling Jaya. The test signals consists of a single DAB stream, Fly FM, and two T-DMB streams, TV3 and a Hot Visual, which carries a slide show with audio signal streamed from the radio station Hot FM.

Despite a success of RTM's pilot trials, the digital terrestrial television transition faced many problems. These problems stemmed from the lesser enthautism of content providers toward the digitisation, with the exception Les Copaque, and the need to improve the nation's Internet broadband infrastructure. With the resignation of then Prime Minister Abdullah Badawi and the succession of Najib Tun Razak, the project by RTM was deferred indefinitely.

Satellite television 
Malaysia's sole satellite television operator, MEASAT Broadcast Network Systems (a subsidiary of Astro Malaysia Holdings) launched the Astro service in launch of the MEASAT-1 satellite as part of Malaysia's commercialisation of space, Astro commenced broadcasting on 1 June 1996 with an initial offering of 3 radio stations and 22 television channels. Today, Astro has over 160 TV channels and Radio Stations, as well as 25 HD channels. They have also started their IPTV service in 2013.

Television

It currently holds exclusive rights from the Malaysian government to offer satellite television broadcasting services in the country through the year 2017. The rights was extended to 2022 recently. However, today Astro contains more than 100 channels including local and international channels and radio channels.

There are also laws preventing too many advertisements from being aired on both radio and television, similar to the United Kingdom.

In December 2011, former prime minister Najib Tun Razak announced that the free-to-view satellite television service by Astro, NJOI, will be made available from February 2012 onwards.

Cable TV 
Mega TV was launched in 1995 by TV3 as the only cable television service. However, it faced stiff competition from the satellite television network Astro, and failed to expand its content. Because of this, it closed down in 2001, and was replaced by its competitor since then.  In 2013, ABN Networks launched their Cable TV service together with Fiber Optic Internet as ABNXcess yet the network also failed to compete with Astro.

Internet Protocol Television (IPTV) 
In contrast to Internet TV, Internet Protocol Television (IPTV) refers to services operated and controlled by a single company, who may also control the 'Final Mile' to the consumers' premises.

DETV, a new paid television provider owned by REDtone, provides television and video-on-demand services on the IPTV platform, targeting the Chinese audiences in Malaysia.

However, Astro is the first broadcast company in Malaysia that introduce the IPTV services, branded as Astro IPTV in collaboration with Maxis Communications and TIME dotCom.

After that, Telekom Malaysia (TM) launched its IPTV services, currently branded as HyppTV in the second quarter of 2009, and now conducts trials with 1,000 selected households in Klang Valley, Penang and Kulim, Kedah.

TM then successfully released their IPTV based on their HSBB Unifi service which only available to Unifi subscriber through nationwide. Collaboration with Astro stopped on 1 August 2016 with termination of both Astro Supersports HD and Astro Supersports 2 HD. HyppTV is rebranded as Unifi TV starting from 12 January 2018.

Mobile TV 
Maxis, DiGi and U Mobile provide mobile television services for reception on third generation mobile phones. They consist of a mixture of regular channels as well as made for mobile channels with looped content. Maxis TV now offers more than 20 channels to Maxis 3G subscribers who own compatible mobile phones. Yet, Maxis is expected to roll out broadcast mobile TV services based on DVB-H in the near future.

U Mobile also provides broadcast mobile TV to users of selected 3G phones, also based on DVB-H.

In October 2008, Astro launched Astro Mobile TV which currently provides 18 channels, all of which are mobile versions of its existing channels, seven of them are under its own brand. This service is only available to Maxis subscribers with compatible 2.5G or 3G handsets, and does not reprise its role from Maxis TV.

Live streaming 
Television received via the Internet may be free, subscription or pay-per-view, multicast, unicast, or peer-to-peer, streamed or downloaded, and use a variety of distribution technologies.  Playback is normally via a computer and broadband Internet connection, although digital media receivers or media centre computers can be used for playback on televisions, such as a computer equipped with Windows Media Center.

Most-viewed channels 
Viewing shares, as of October 2021.

Channels from neighbouring countries

See also 
 List of television stations in Malaysia
 List of Malay language television channels

References